Clarissa Johnston (born 14 November 1990) is a South African synchronized swimmer. She competed in the 2020 Summer Olympics.

References

1990 births
Living people
South African synchronised swimmers
Synchronized swimmers at the 2020 Summer Olympics
Olympic synchronised swimmers of South Africa